Barrackpore Police Commissionerate or Barrackpore City Police, established on 20 January 2012, is a city police force with primary responsibilities in law enforcement and investigation within the area which roughly constitutes the Barrackpore subdivision, and is located within the northern part of Kolkata metropolitan area. The Commissionerate is part of the West Bengal Police, and is under the administrative control of Home Ministry of West Bengal. It was formed after bifurcation of the North 24 Parganas Police District, and has 16 police stations under its jurisdiction. Sanjoy Mukherjee was appointed as the first Commissioner of the Barrackpore Police Commissionerate.

Structure and jurisdiction

The police commissionerate is situated at Barrackpore, and is divided into two divisions – Barrackpore and Belghoria. The commissionerate is responsible for law enforcement over an area of  area with 25 police stations under it. The commissionerate is headed by the Commissioner of Police, who is an Indian Police Service officer in the rank of Inspector-General of Police (IGP). The commissioner is assisted by a joint commissioner. There are two deputy commissioners for the two divisions. Other departments, including the detective department and the traffic wing are headed by Additional deputy commissioners, who are in the rank of deputy superintendent of police. The police stations are headed by an Inspector.

Police stations

1. Baranagar PS
2. Barrackpore PS
3. Basudebpur PS
4. Belgharia PS
5. Bhatpara PS
6. Bizpore PS
7. Dakshineswar PS
8. Dum Dum PS
9. Ghola PS
10. Halisahar PS
11. Jagaddal PS
12. Jetia PS
13. Kamarhati PS
14. Khardah PS
15. Mohanpur PS
16. Nagerbazar PS
17. Naihati PS
18.  Nababarakpur PS
19. Nimta PS
20. Noapara PS
21. Rahara PS
22. Shibdaspur PS
23. Titagarh  PS
24. Woman PS 
25. Cyber Crime PS

See also
 Howrah Police Commissionerate
 Bidhannagar Police Commissionerate
 Kolkata Police
 West Bengal Police

References

External links
 Barrackpore Traffic Police official website

Metropolitan law enforcement agencies of India
Government of Kolkata
West Bengal Police
Police Commissionerate in West Bengal
2012 establishments in West Bengal
Government agencies established in 2012